Mulberrofuran G (albanol A) is a bio-active compound isolated from the bark of Morus alba.

References

Benzochromenes
Benzofurans
Phenols
Oxygen heterocycles
Heterocyclic compounds with 5 rings